The Arab Unification Party is an Islamist political party that was founded by former leaders of the Egyptian Islamic Labour Party, independents and Islamists. The party withdrew from the Anti-Coup Alliance.

References

2011 establishments in Egypt
Arab nationalism in Egypt
Arab nationalist political parties
Islamic political parties in Egypt
Nationalist parties in Egypt
Pan-Arabist political parties
Political parties established in 2011